Schwenda is a village and a former municipality in the Mansfeld-Südharz district, Saxony-Anhalt, Germany. Since 1 January 2010, it is part of the municipality Südharz. The village is known for its unusual octagonal baroque church.

References 

Former municipalities in Saxony-Anhalt
Südharz
Villages in the Harz